Dawson is a city in Lac qui Parle County, Minnesota, United States. The population was 1,466 at the 2020 census.

History
Dawson was platted in 1884. The city was named for William Dawson, a former mayor of St. Paul, and one of three partners in the Dawson Townsite Company. A post office has been in operation at Dawson since 1884. The city was incorporated in 1885.

Geography
The West Branch of the Lac qui Parle River flows through the city. U.S. Route 212 serves as a main route in the city. The BNSF Railway runs through the city.

Demographics

2010 census
As of the census of 2010, there were 1,540 people, 682 households, and 412 families living in the city. The racial makeup of the city was 97.4% White, 0.4% African American, 0.4% Native American, 0.1% Pacific Islander, 0.6% from other races, and 1.1% from two or more races. Hispanic or Latino of any race were 2.3% of the population.

There were 682 households, of which 23.8% had children under the age of 18 living with them, 48.5% were married couples living together, 8.5% had a female householder with no husband present, 3.4% had a male householder with no wife present, and 39.6% were non-families. 36.5% of all households were made up of individuals, and 19.8% had someone living alone who was 65 years of age or older. The average household size was 2.16 and the average family size was 2.78.

The median age in the city was 47.8 years. 21.8% of residents were under the age of 18; 4.9% were between the ages of 18 and 24; 19.5% were from 25 to 44; 28% were from 45 to 64; and 25.7% were 65 years of age or older. The gender makeup of the city was 47.2% male and 52.8% female.

2000 census
As of the census of 2000, there were 1,539 people, 677 households, and 398 families living in the city. The racial makeup of the city was 98.25% White, 0.19% African American, 0.32% Native American, 0.32% Asian, and 0.91% from two or more races. Hispanic or Latino of any race were 0.52% of the population.

There were 677 households, out of which 24.4% had children under the age of 18 living with them, 53.5% were married couples living together, 3.4% had a female householder with no husband present, and 41.2% were non-families. 39.1% of all households were made up of individuals, and 25.7% had someone living alone who was 65 years of age or older.  The average household size was 2.17 and the average family size was 2.88.

In the city, the population was spread out, with 21.6% under the age of 18, 6.7% from 18 to 24, 21.4% from 25 to 44, 20.5% from 45 to 64, and 29.7% who were 65 years of age or older.  The median age was 45 years. For every 100 females, there were 87.7 males.  For every 100 females age 18 and over, there were 83.0 males.

The median income for a household in the city was $31,442, and the median income for a family was $46,484. Males had a median income of $30,493 versus $18,750 for females. The per capita income for the city was $19,084.  About 3.3% of families and 7.4% of the population were below the poverty line, including 5.0% of those under age 18 and 10.7% of those age 65 or over.

Politics

Notable people
Helmer "Dawson" Carlson - First baby born in Dawson, Minnesota
Theodore Christianson - 21st Governor of Minnesota from January 6, 1925, until January 6, 1931; resident of Dawson and publisher of the Dawson Sentinel.
Theodore Christianson - Minnesota Supreme Court justice and eldest son of Governor Christianson
Phyllis Gates - Wife of Hollywood actor Rock Hudson (1955–1958)
James Day Hodgson - United States Secretary of Labor (1970-1973); born in Dawson
Brandon Hurley - Featured on ninth season, 34th episode of "Made", a television series on MTV (Jan. 10, 2009) 
Jeff Nordgaard - Second-round NBA draft pick in 1996
Howard Wads Rundquist - businessman, educator, and politician
Carrie Tollefson - Olympian at 1500 meters in 2004, NCAA cross country champion in 1997

Notable places
Dawson is home to the Dawson Bank Museum, a Carnegie Library building (now a law office), and an armory building (now a public library and apartments).  All three of these buildings are listed on the National Register of Historic Places.

In culture
 The movie Sweet Land (2005) was partly filmed in Dawson.
An episode of MTV's "Made" took place primarily in Dawson.
Love Thy Neighbor: A Rural Doctor's Struggle for Home in Rural America is a book by Dr. Ayaz Virji that talks about his experience in Rural America, specifically, Dawson, Minnesota

Town culture

Gnomes
Dawson, also known as Gnometown USA, commemorates its notable citizens by making them into 3-foot tall gnomes that are placed either in the Dawson Public Library or Gnome Park.  The gnomes are revealed to the community during Riverfest, an annual celebration for the town.  Each gnome gets its own legend. (found here)  New gnomes have been added every year since 1989.  There are more than 40 gnomes in Gnome Park with more being added every year.  In 2020–2021, the town added a Troll, instead of a gnome, to Gnome Park, representing COVID-19 and the way the community banded together to banish it from the town.

References

External links
 
City of Dawson, MN -- Official site
 Dawson-Boyd Schools -- Official site
Dawson Area Chamber of Commerce -- Official site
City-Data.com

Cities in Minnesota
Cities in Lac qui Parle County, Minnesota